Alice Ambrose Lazerowitz (November 25, 1906 – January 25, 2001) was an American philosopher, logician, and author.

Early life and education
Alice Loman Ambrose was born in Lexington, Illinois and orphaned when she was 13 years old. She studied philosophy and mathematics at Millikin University (1924–28). After completing her PhD at the University of Wisconsin–Madison in 1932, she went to Cambridge University (Newnham College) to study with G. E. Moore and Ludwig Wittgenstein, where she earned a second PhD in 1938.

Wittgenstein
Having become a close disciple of Wittgenstein, Ambrose later related her association with him in Ludwig Wittgenstein: Philosophy and Language (1972), a volume co-edited with her husband Morris Lazerowitz. Along with fellow student Margaret MacDonald she secretly (since he did not allow this) made notes during Wittgenstein's lectures, which were later published. She was one of a select group of students to whom Wittgenstein dictated the so-called Blue and Brown Books, which outline the transition in Wittgenstein's thought between his two major works, Tractatus Logico-Philosophicus and Philosophical Investigations. Wittgenstein terminated their association abruptly in 1935, when Ambrose decided, with encouragement from G.E.Moore, to publish an article entitled "Finitism in Mathematics" in the philosophical journal Mind which was intended to give an account of Wittgenstein's position on the subject.

Career
Ambrose began her career at the University of Michigan, when she returned to the United States in 1935. She then took a position in Smith College in 1937, where she remained for the rest of her career. She was awarded the Austin and Sophia Smith chair in Philosophy in 1964 and became Professor Emeritus in 1972. Between 1953 and 1968, she was editor of the Journal of Symbolic Logic. 
She worked chiefly in logic and mathematical philosophy, writing a primer on the subject with her husband which became a widely used textbook and was known as "Ambrose and Lazerowitz". She collaborated with her husband on a number of works: Fundamentals of Symbolic Logic (1948), Logic: The Theory of Formal Inference (1961), Philosophical Theories (1976) and Essays in the Unknown Wittgenstein (1984). Even after her retirement she continued to teach and guest lecture at Smith, Hampshire College, the University of Delaware, and other universities around the country until her death, at the age of 94, on January 25, 2001.

Her personal papers are held at Smith College Archives.

Publications

Ambrose, Alice. (1989)  "Moore and Wittgenstein as Teachers," Teaching Philosophy 12(2): 107-113.

See also
American philosophy
List of American philosophers

References

External links 

 Alice Ambrose Lazerowitz and Morris Lazerowitz papers at the Smith College Archives, Smith College Special Collections

1906 births
2001 deaths
Wittgensteinian philosophers
People from Lexington, Illinois
20th-century American philosophers
American women philosophers
Logicians
American logicians
Women logicians
Institute for Advanced Study visiting scholars
Millikin University alumni
University of Wisconsin–Madison alumni
Smith College faculty
Philosophers from Illinois
Philosophers from Wisconsin
Alumni of Newnham College, Cambridge
Mathematicians from Illinois
University of Michigan faculty
20th-century American women